Tactusa topi is a moth of the family Erebidae first described by Michael Fibiger in 2010. It is known from Guangdong in China.

The wingspan is about 11 mm. The ground colour of the forewing is light yellow, with a quadrangular blackish patch in the upper medial area and a prominently broad black subterminal area. Only the subterminal and terminal lines are marked, the former inwardly outlined by light yellow and the latter with black interneural spots. The hindwing is dark grey, with a discal spot and the underside is unicolorous grey.

References

Micronoctuini
Taxa named by Michael Fibiger
Moths described in 2010